Odostomia citrina is a species of sea snail, a marine gastropod mollusk in the family Pyramidellidae, the pyrams and their allies.

Description
The shell grows to a length of 2 mm.

Distribution
This species occurs in the following locations:
 Cape Verde

References

External links
 To Encyclopedia of Life

citrina
Gastropods described in 1869
Gastropods of Cape Verde